Binod Gowal is an Asom Gana Parishad politician from Assam, India. He was elected to Assam Legislative Assembly in 1985, 1991, 1996 and 2006 from Sarupathar constituency.

References 

Living people
Asom Gana Parishad politicians
Assam MLAs 1985–1991
Assam MLAs 1991–1996
Assam MLAs 1996–2001
Assam MLAs 2006–2011
People from Golaghat district
Year of birth missing (living people)